Prescot South is a Knowsley Metropolitan Borough Council Ward. The ward was created for the 2016 municipal election when the number of councillors on Knowsley Metropolitan Borough Council was reduced from 63 to 45.

The ward is in the St Helens South and Whiston constituency.

Councillors

Election results

Elections of the 2010s

May 2019 
Candidates so far declared:

May 2018

May 2016

Notes

• italics denotes the sitting councillor • bold denotes the winning candidate

References 

Wards of Merseyside
Metropolitan Borough of Knowsley